Lucila Salao-Tolentino (born July 1, 1954) is a Filipino sprinter. She competed in the women's 4 × 100 metres relay at the 1972 Summer Olympics. She was also the holder of the Philippine national record (14.3) in the 100 meter hurdles.

References

1954 births
Living people
Athletes (track and field) at the 1972 Summer Olympics
Filipino female sprinters
Filipino female hurdlers
Olympic track and field athletes of the Philippines
Place of birth missing (living people)
Asian Games medalists in athletics (track and field)
Asian Games bronze medalists for the Philippines
Athletes (track and field) at the 1978 Asian Games
Medalists at the 1978 Asian Games